Peter Hewat (born 17 March 1978) is a former Australian rugby union player now coaching in Japan's Top League for Ricoh Black Rams. He previously played for the NSW Waratahs Central Coast Rays London Irish and Suntory Sungoliath. On 12 April 2010, it was confirmed that Hewat was leaving London Irish to go play in Japan.

Youth

Originally from Inverell in north-west NSW, Hewat is a product of Brisbane's renowned Rugby nursery, Nudgee College. In spite of this, he did not play his first game until the age of 14. A natural athlete, within a year he was playing in the first XV alongside former Queensland Red Elton Flatley.

Hewat also showed great potential as a junior cricketer ultimately representing Australia at the schoolboy level. Hewat then had a short yet successful stint in the Brisbane 1st grade club competition before he began to concentrate on rugby more seriously. In 2003, Hewat represented the Potoroo's 7 A Side Rugby Team where he won player of the tournament at the prestigious Darwin Hottest Sevens.

Hewat is the son of a cousin of former Australian Test cricketer Rick McCosker.
He moved on to Australian U21 duties in 1998, before representing Australia at Sevens from 2001 to 2003.

2005
2005 can only be described as a watershed year in the career of Hewat. The leading Super 12 pointscorer in his debut year, his 10 tries broke Scott Staniforth's Waratah record for tries in a season. He also smashed Matthew Burke's NSW record for points in a season, finishing with 243 points from 17 games during 2005.
Almost unbelievably, Hewat came into 2005 with just two state caps and five points to his name. An electrifying and unpredictable fullback and winger, he missed just one match for the season, when he was rested from the Waratahs clash with the Romanian Barbarians on the Gulf Air development tour of Eastern Europe. On top of this, Hewat played two games for Australia A and captained Manly to within one win of the Tooheys New Cup Grand Final.

2006

In the game against the Blues in round seven of the Super 14, Hewat moved on to second on the all-time pointscorers list for the Waratahs, his 28-point haul in the match seeing him move on to 359 points to surpass Marty Roebuck who held the spot with 337 points. Only Matt Burke (1147) has scored more points for New South Wales.

In the same match, he also equalled Burke's record for scoring 100 season points in seven Super matches.
In round eight against the Cheetahs, Hewat's 27 point haul saw him surpass 300 Super points. Two rounds later, against the Brumbies, Hewat surpassed the 400 point mark for NSW.
Hewat's haul of points in the round 14 match v Hurricanes at Aussie Stadium saw him register 177 points for the season – establishing a record for the most Super Rugby points in a season.
Hewat's outstanding form in the 2006 Tooheys New Cup saw him awarded the Ken Catchpole Medal for 2006.
The telling impact Hewat can have on a match was again evident when he came on as a replacement in the APC match against the Western Force. He came on as a replacement in the second half and scored a quick-fire 17 points in the space of 20 minutes, equalling the record for the most points in a match by a replacement, previously set by Tim Kelaher.

Leaves Australia
After the end of the 2007 S14 season it was leaked to the press and Hewat himself that he was not in the reckoning for a Wallaby position and will not be included in the squad. This left Hewat disillusioned and resulted in his decision to consider lucrative offers from oversees.
On 27 July 2007, it was confirmed by NSWRU and Hewat that they had worked out a release so he could continue playing rugby over in Europe and demand significantly more than what he earned in Australia.

Records and Achievements

The leading Super 12 pointscorer in his debut year (2005).
The NSW record for points in a season, finishing with 243 points from 17 games during 2005.
Second only to Matt Burke (1147) in all-time points for New South Wales
He equalled Burke's record for scoring 100 season points in seven Super matches.
He surpassed the 400 point mark for NSW in round 10 2006.
Registered 177 points for the season – establishing a record for the most Super Rugby points in a season in the round 14 match v Hurricanes . This has since been broken by Dan Carter.
Awarded the Ken Catchpole Medal for outstanding form in the 2006 Tooheys New Cup

References

External links
London Irish profile
NSW Profile
Article
itsrugby.co.uk profile

1978 births
Australian rugby union players
New South Wales Waratahs players
ACT Brumbies players
Living people
London Irish players
Barbarian F.C. players
Rugby union fullbacks
Tokyo Sungoliath players
Australian expatriate rugby union players
Expatriate rugby union players in England
Expatriate rugby union players in Japan
Australian expatriate sportspeople in Japan
Australian expatriate sportspeople in England
Rugby union players from New South Wales